This is a list of Guggenheim Fellowships awarded in 1966.

1966 United States and Canadian Fellows

Peter Agostini, deceased. Fine Arts: Sculpture: 1966.
Philip Aisen, Professor of Biophysics and Medicine, Albert Einstein College of Medicine, Yeshiva University: 1966
Calvin Albert, Sculptor; retired Professor of Art, Pratt Institute: 1966.
René Albrecht-Carrié, deceased. Political Science: 1966.
, Professor of Chemistry, Princeton University: 1966, 1967.
Robert B. Alter, Class of 1937 Professor of Hebrew and Comparative Literature, University of California, Berkeley: 1966, 1978.
A. R. Ammons, deceased. Poetry: 1966.
Ansel Cochran Anderson, Emeritus Professor of Physics, University of Illinois at Urbana-Champaign: 1966.
John Kinloch Anderson, Professor Emeritus of Classics, University of California, Berkeley: 1966.
Hal Oscar Anger, researcher, Berkeley, California: 1966.
Daniel Edward Atkinson, Emeritus Professor of Biochemistry, University of California, Los Angeles: 1966.
Kenneth Kyle Bailey, Professor of History, University of Texas at El Paso: 1966.
S. George Bankoff, Walter P. Murphy Professor of Chemical Engineering, Northwestern University: 1966.
Hubert Lloyd Barnes, Distinguished Professor Emeritus of Geochemistry, Pennsylvania State University: 1966.
Donald Barthelme, deceased. Fiction: 1966.
Irving H. Bartlett, John F. Kennedy Professor Emeritus of American Civilization, University of Massachusetts Boston: 1966.
Richard Reeve Baxter, deceased. Law: 1966.
Robert E. Beardsley, Professor of Biology, Iona College, New Rochelle, New York: 1966.
Clifford O. Berg, deceased. Professor of Limnology, Cornell University: 1966.
Klaus Berger, University Distinguished Professor Emeritus of Art History, University of Kansas: 1966.
Olga Bernal, Retired Professor of French, State University of New York at Buffalo: 1966.
Lloyd Eason Berry, deceased. 16th & 17th Century English Literature: 1966.
William B. N. Berry, Professor of Paleontology, University of California, Berkeley: 1966.
Haim Blanc, deceased. Linguistics: 1966.
David Bodansky, Emeritus Professor of Physics, University of Washington: 1966, 1974.
Dietrich von Bothmer, Distinguished Research Curator of Greek and Roman Art, Metropolitan Museum of Art: 1966.
Frank Brady, deceased. Biography: 1966.
Irving A. Breger, deceased. Chemistry: 1966.
Walter E. Bron, Professor of Physics, University of California, Irvine: 1966.
George John Buelow, Emeritus Professor of Musicology, Indiana University: 1966.
Peter Burchard, writer, Williamstown, Massachusetts: 1966.
David P. Calleo, Dean Acheson Professor of European Studies and Director, Washington Center of Foreign Policy Research, Johns Hopkins University: 1966.
Malcolm John Campbell, Class of 1965 Professor Emeritus, School of Arts and Sciences, University of Pennsylvania: 1966.
Paul Caponigro, photographer, Rockport, Maine: 1966, 1975.
Harry Gilbert Carlson, Emeritus Professor of Drama and Theatre, Queens College, City University of New York: 1966.
Thomas A. Carlson, retired Chemist, Oak Ridge National Laboratory: 1966.
Diego Catalán, Professor Emeritus of Spanish Literature, University of California, San Diego: 1966.
Giorgio Cavallon, deceased. Fine Arts-Painting: 1966.
John Angus Chamberlain, sculptor, Shelter Island, New York: 1966, 1977.
Arthur Barclay Chapman, Professor Emeritus of Genetics and Animal Sciences, University of Wisconsin–Madison: 1966.
Sterling Chaykin, Professor of Biochemistry, University of California, Davis: 1966.
Philip Stanley Chen, Jr., senior advisor to the Deputy Director for Intramural Research, National Institutes of Health, Bethesda, Maryland: 1966.
William Chinowsky, Professor Emeritus of Physics, University of California, Berkeley: 1966, 1978.
Tse-tsung Chow, Professor of East Asian Languages and Literature and History, University of Wisconsin–Madison: 1966.
Howard H. Claassen, Professor Emeritus of Physics, Wheaton College, Illinois: 1966.
James W. Cobble, Professor of Chemistry and Dean, Graduate Division and Research, San Diego State University: 1966.
Roger David Cole, Professor Emeritus of Molecular and Cell Biology, University of California, Berkeley: 1966.
James Samuel Coleman, deceased. Sociology: 1966.
Richard Michael Cyert, President, Carnegie Bosch Institute and Professor of Economics and Management, Carnegie Mellon University: 1966.
Robert Damora, architect, Bedford, New York: 1966.
Alfred David, Professor Emeritus of English, Indiana University: 1966.
Cecil Dawkins, writer, Santa Fe: 1966.
John M. Day, Research Associate, CNRS; Instructor in Economic History, University of Paris VII: 1966.
Dante Della Terza, Irving Babbitt Professor Emeritus of Comparative Literature, Harvard University: 1966.
David Del Tredici, Distinguished Professor of Music, City College of New York: 1966.
Stanley Deser, Enid and Natlian S. Ancell Professor of Physics, Brandeis University: 1966.
Richard M. Diamond, Senior Scientist Emeritus, Lawrence Berkeley Laboratory, University of California, Berkeley: 1966.
Joseph Francis Dillon, Jr., Adjunct Professor of Applied Physics, Yale University: 1966.
Peter C. Dodwell, Professor Emeritus of Psychology, Queen's University at Kingston: 1966.
Sherman Drexler, painter, New York City: 1966.
Edward Dugmore, deceased. Fine Arts-Painting: 1966.
Alan Dundes, Professor of Anthropology and Folklore, University of California, Berkeley: 1966.
Richard S. Dunn, Professor of History, University of Pennsylvania: 1966.
Friedel Dzubas, deceased. Fine Arts: Painting: 1966, 1968.
Stanley Lawrence Elkin, deceased. Fiction: 1966.
Albert Elsen, deceased. Fine Arts Research: 1966.
Klaus Epstein, deceased. German and East European History: 1966.
Robert Marvin Epstein, Harold Carron Professor of Anesthesiology, University of Virginia School of Medicine: 1966.
Charlotte J. Erickson, Paul Mellon Professor Emeritus of American History, Cambridge University: 1966.
Robert Carl Erickson, deceased. Composer; Professor Emeritus of Music, University of California, San Diego: 1966.
Bernard B. Fall, deceased. Political Science: 1966.
George Siemers Fayen, Jr., scholar, New Haven, Connecticut: 1966.
Raymond Federman, Melodia E. Jones Distinguished Professor of French and Comparative Literature, State University of New York at Buffalo: 1966.
Eugene Feldman, deceased. Fine Arts: 1966.
Morton Feldman, deceased. Music Composition: 1966.
Donald Finkel, poet; Emeritus Poet-in-Residence, Washington University: 1966.
Constantine Fitzgibbon, deceased. General Non-Fiction: 1966.
Eleanor Flexner, deceased. Biography: 1966.
Jesse Hill Ford, deceased. Fiction: 1966.
Edward Frank, Architect, Middletown, New Jersey: 1966.
Avner Friedman, director, Institute of Mathematics, University of Minnesota: 1966.
Vincent Sauter Frohne, Professor of Theory and Composition and Special Lecturer in New Music, Western Illinois University: 1966.
Frank Gallo, Sculptor; Professor of Art, University of Illinois at Urbana-Champaign: 1966.
Paul Roesel Garabedian, Professor of Mathematics, Courant Institute of Mathematical Sciences, New York University: 1966, 1981.
Edward T. Gargan, deceased. French History: 1966.
Peter Gay, Sterling Professor Emeritus of History, Yale University: 1966, 1977.
William Gale Gedney, deceased. Photographer; Assistant Professor of Photography, Pratt Institute: 1966.
Ernest M. Gifford, Professor Emeritus of Botany, University of California, Davis: 1966.
Gerald Ernest Paul Gillespie, Professor of German Studies and Comparative Literature, Stanford University: 1966.
Hans Goedicke, Professor of Near Eastern Studies, Johns Hopkins University: 1966.
Jack Stanley Goldstein, Professor of Physics, Brandeis University: 1966.
Eugene Goldwasser, Chairman, Committee on Developmental Biology; Professor of Biochemistry and Molecular Biology, University of Chicago: 1966.
Robert Allen Goldwin, retired Resident Scholar and Director of Seminar Program, American Enterprise Institute for Public Policy Research, Washington, D.C.: 1966.
Charles Montgomery Gray, Professor of History, University of Chicago: 1966.
John Colton Greene, Professor Emeritus of History, University of Connecticut: 1966.
Robert A. Gross, Percy K. and L. W. Hudson Professor Emeritus of Applied Physics and Dean Emeritus, Columbia University: 1966
Donald Harris, Professor of Music, The Ohio State University: 1966.
Francis Russell Hart, Professor of English, University of Massachusetts Boston: 1966.
Van Austin Harvey, George Edwin Burnell Professor Emeritus of Religious Studies, Stanford University: 1966, 1971.
Larry A. Haskin, R. E. Morrow Distinguished University Professor of Earth and Planetary Sciences and Professor of Chemistry, Washington University: 1966.
Bernhard Heiden, composer; Professor Emeritus of Music, Indiana University: 1966.
Al Held, painter, Boiceville, New York: 1966.
Fredric William Hill, Professor of Nutrition, University of California, Davis: 1966.
Stanley P. Hirshson, Professor of History, Queens College, City University of New York: 1966.
Richard Hofstadter, deceased. U.S. History: 1966.
C. Hugh Holman, deceased. American Literature: 1966.
Fernando Horcasitas, deceased. Anthropology: 1966.
Richard Joseph Howard, poet and translator; Professor of Practice, Columbia University: 1966.
Herbert Howarth, deceased. 20th Century English Literature: 1966.
Gerald Humel, Composer, Berlin: 1966.
William Paul Jacobs, Professor Emeritus of Biology, Princeton University: 1966.
Owen H. Jander, Catherine Mills Davis Professor Emeritus of Music History, Wellesley College, 1966.
James Allister Jenkins, Professor of Mathematics, Washington University: 1966.
Winthrop Donaldson Jordan, Professor of History and Afro-American Studies: University of Mississippi: 1966.
Alvin M. Josephy, Jr., writer; Senior Editor, American Heritage Publishing Company, New York City; Chairman, Board of Trustees, National Museum of the American Indian, Smithsonian Institution: 1966.
Wolf Kahn, painter, New York City: 1966.
Attallah Kappas, Sherman Fairchild Professor of Medicine, Rockefeller University; Physician-in-Chief Emeritus, The Rockefeller University Hospital: 1966.
Howard Clark Kee, William Goodwin Aurelio Professor Emeritus of Biblical Studies, Boston University: 1966.
Maurice Kelley, deceased. 16th and 17th Century English Literature: 1966.
Young B. Kim, Professor of Physics and Electrical Engineering, University of Southern California: 1966.
Solon T. Kimball, deceased. Education: 1966.
Adolf D. Klarmann, deceased. Germanics: 1966.
Janet E. Knapp, Professor Emeritus of Music, Vassar College: 1966.
Ernest John Knapton, deceased. French History: 1966.
Gabriel Morris Kolko, Distinguished Research Professor Emeritus, York University, Canada: 1966.
Arnold Kramish, consultant, Reston, Virginia: 1966.
Edwin G. Krebs, Senior Investigator and Professor Emeritus of Pharmacology, University of Washington: 1966.
Karl Kroeber, Mellon Professor of the Humanities, Columbia University: 1966.
Donald Newton Langenberg, Chancellor, University of Maryland: 1966.
John Clarke Lapp, deceased. French: 1966, 1973.
George G. Laties, Professor of Plant Physiology, University of California, Los Angeles: 1966.
David M. Lee, Professor of Physics, Cornell University: 1966, 1974.
Tsung-Dao Lee, University Professor, Columbia University: 1966.
Isaac Levi, John Dewey Professor of Philosophy, Columbia University: 1966.
David Levine, graphic artist, Brooklyn, New York: 1966.
Richard Warrington Baldwin Lewis, Emeritus Professor of English and American Studies, Yale University: 1966, 1975.
Robert Hall Lewis, Professor of Music, Goucher College; Professor of Composition, Peabody Institute of the Johns Hopkins University; Artistic Director, Chamber Music Society of Baltimore: 1966, 1979.
Richard B. Lillich, deceased. Law:: 1966.
John Clyde Loftis, Jr., Margery Bailey Professor Emeritus of English, Stanford University: 1966.
Val R. Lorwin, deceased. Economics: 1966.
Marshall Luban, Professor of Physics, Iowa State University: 1966.
Sven Lukin, painter, New York City: 1966.
Malcolm Harris Macfarlane, Professor of Physics, Indiana University: 1966.
Frank Manley, Charles Howard Candler Professor of Renaissance Literature, Emory University: 1966, 1978.
Jay Martin, Edward S. Gould Professor of Humanities, Claremont McKenna College: 1966.
Ramón Martínez-López, deceased. Spanish & Portuguese Literature: 1966.
John D. Martz, Professor of Political Science, Pennsylvania State University: 1966.
Ralph Noel Maud, Professor of English, Simon Fraser University: 1966.
David Mayer, III, Emeritus Professor of Drama, University of Manchester: 1966.
Tom Mayer, writer: 1966.
Donald B. McCormick, Emeritus Professor of Biochemistry, Emory University: 1966.
Earl W. McDaniel, Regents' Professor of Physics, Georgia Institute of Technology: 1966.
A. Douglas McLaren, deceased. Biology: 1966.
Terrence McNally, playwright, New York City: 1966, 1969.
Donald William Meinig, Maxwell Research Professor of Geography, Syracuse University: 1966.
DeForest Mellon, Jr., Professor of Biology, University of Virginia: 1966.
H. Roy Merrens, Emeritus Professor of Geography, York University, Canada: 1966.
Matthew Stanley Meselson, Thomas Dudley Cabot Professor of Natural Sciences, Harvard University: 1966.
Ray K. Metzker, photographer; Professor of Photography, Philadelphia College of Art: 1966, 1979.
Alfred F. Michael, Dean, Regents' Professor of Pediatrics, University of Minnesota Medical School: 1966.
Eleanore Mikus, Emeritus Professor of Art, Cornell University: 1966.
David P. Milby, Painter; Associate Professor of Visual and Integrative Arts, Pennsylvania State University (Ogontz): 1966.
Clarence H. Miller, Dorothy McBride Orthwein Professor of Literature, St. Louis University: 1966.
William Wright Milstead, deceased. Biology: 1966.
N. Scott Momaday, Professor of English, University of Arizona: 1966.
Cathleen S. Morawetz, Emeritus Professor of Mathematics, New York University: 1966, 1978.
Ruth Mortimer, deceased. Bibliography: 1966.
Rhoads Murphey, Professor of Geography and Director, Center for Chinese Studies, University of Michigan: 1966.
Fredric Myrow, composer, Los Angeles, California: 1966.
Thomas Nagel, Professor of Philosophy and Law, New York University: 1966.
Robert James Nelson, Professor Emeritus of French, University of Illinois at Urbana-Champaign: 1966.
Louis Nirenberg, Professor of Mathematics, New York University: 1966, 1975.
Lewis Harold Nosanow, Vice-Chancellor for Research, Dean of Graduate Studies and Professor of Physics, University of California, Irvine: 1966.
Holger Olof Nygard, Professor Emeritus of English, Duke University: 1966.
Joan L. L. Oates, tutor and Director of Studies in Archaeology, Girton College, University of Cambridge: 1966.
Gerhard Oertel, Professor Emeritus of Geology, University of California, Los Angeles: 1966.
Frank Sumio Okada, painter; Professor of Art, University of Oregon: 1966.
Susumu Okubo, Professor of Physics and Astronomy, University of Rochester: 1966.
Philip Moore Orville, deceased. Geology: 1966.
John Harold Ostrom, Professor of Geology and Geophysics and Curator of Vertebrate Paleontology in the Peabody Museum, Yale University: 1966.
Albert L. Page, Emeritus Professor of Soil Science, University of California, Riverside: 1966.
Alwin M. Pappenheimer, Jr., deceased. Biochemistry and Molecular Biology: 1966.
William Nelson Parker, Philip G. Bartlett Professor of Economics and Economic History, Yale University: 1966.
Talcott Parsons, deceased. Sociology: 1966.
Herbert Penzl, Professor Emeritus of Germanic Philology, University of California, Berkeley: 1966.
George Perle, composer; Professor Emeritus of Music, Queens College, City University of New York: 1966, 1974.
Robert Louis Peters, Emeritus Professor of English, University of California, Irvine: 1966.
Otto Pflanze, Emeritus Professor of History, Indiana University: 1966.
Burton E. Pike, Professor of Comparative Literature and German, CUNY Graduate School, NYC: 1966.
Thomas Clive Pinney, William M. Keck Distinguished Service Emeritus Professor of English, Pomona College: 1966, 1984.
Taylor M. Potter, writer, architect, and minister, Centre Hall, Pennsylvania: 1966.
Henry Primakoff, deceased. Particle Physics: 1966.
Walter H. Principe, deceased. Medieval History: 1966.
William M. Protheroe, Professor Emeritus of Astronomy, The Ohio State University: 1966.
Michael C. J. Putnam, MacMillan Professor of Classics, and Professor of Comparative Literature, Brown University: 1966.
Kenneth Eyre Read, Professor of Anthropology, University of Washington: 1966.
Luciano Rebay, Giuseppe Ungaretti Professor in Italian Literature, Columbia University: 1966.
William Henry Reinmuth, deceased. Chemistry: 1966.
F. David Roberts, William E. Collis Professor Emeritus of History, Dartmouth College: 1966.
Warren Everett Roberts, deceased. Professor of Folklore, Indiana University: 1966.
Dean Wentworth Robinson, Professor of Chemistry, Johns Hopkins University: 1966.
Francis John Rolle, deceased. Biology: 1966.
Thomas G. Rosenmeyer, Professor Emeritus of Greek and Comparative Literature, University of California, Berkeley: 1966, 1982.
Russell Ross, deceased. Biochemistry-Molecular Biology: 1966.
Klaus Ruedenberg, Distinguished Professor Emeritus of Chemistry and Emeritus Professor of Physics, Iowa State University: 1966.
Charles A. Ryskamp, Emeritus Director, The Pierpont Morgan Library and The Frick Collection, New York City: 1966.
Gerald Enoch Sacks, Professor of Mathematical Logic, Massachusetts Institute of Technology; Professor of Mathematical Logic, Harvard University: 1966.
Theodore Saloutos, deceased. Economic History: 1966.
Irene Samuel, deceased. 16th & 17th Century English Literature: 1966.
Hiroshi Sato, Ross Distinguished Professor Emeritus of Engineering, Purdue University: 1966.
David Schachter, Professor of Physiology & Cellular Biophysics, College of Physicians and Surgeons, Director M.D.-Ph.D. program, Columbia University: 1966.
Evert Irving Schlinger, Professor Emeritus of Entomology, University of California, Berkeley: 1966.
David M. Schneider, deceased. Anthropology and Cultural Studies: 1966.
J. Robert Schrieffer, University Eminent Scholar Professor, Florida State University System and Chief Scientist, National High Magnetic Field Laboratory, Florida State University, Tallahassee: 1966.
Juergen Schulz, Andrea V. Rosenthal Emeritus Professor of Art, Brown University: 1966.
Hisham B. Sharabi, Professor of History, Georgetown University: 1966.
Stanford Jay Shaw, Professor of History, University of California, Los Angeles: 1966.
Tsung-Yuen Shen, Emeritus Professor of Economics, University of California, Davis: 1966.
Irwin William Sherman, Emeritus Professor of Biology, University of California, Riverside: 1966.
David S. Shwayder, Professor Emeritus of Philosophy, University of Illinois at Urbana-Champaign: 1966.
Philip Warnock Silver, Professor of Spanish, Columbia University: 1966.
Joseph Silverman, Professor Emeritus of Chemical Engineering, University of Maryland, College Park: 1966.
Rita J. Simon, University Professor, American University: 1966.
Marcus Singer, deceased. Biology: 1966.
Aaron H. Siskind, deceased. Photography: 1966.
Robert A. Skotheim, President, The Huntington Library, Art Collections and Botanical Gardens, San Marino: 1966.
Glen A. Slack, Research Professor, Rensselaer Polytech Institute, Troy, New York: 1966.
Susan Sontag, Writer, New York City: 1966, 1975.
William E. Stafford, oDeceased. Poetry: 1966.
Peter D. Stansky, Frances and Charles Field Professor of History, Stanford University: 1966, 1973.
Leonard David Stein, retired director, Arnold Schoenberg Institute, University of Southern California: 1966.
Martin Stevens, Professor of English, Baruch College, City University of New York and Dean, School of Liberal Arts and Sciences: 1966.
John Edward Sunder, Professor of History, University of Texas at Austin: 1966.
Andrew G. Szent-Győrgyi, Professor of Biology, Brandeis University: 1966.
William Walker Tait, III, Emeritus Professor of Philosophy, University of Chicago: 1966.
Willard Thorp, deceased. Holmes Professor Emeritus of Belles-Lettres, Princeton University: 1966.
Peter Larsen Thorslev, Jr., Professor Emeritus of English, University of California, Los Angeles: 1966.
Douglas Young Thorson, Professor of Economics, Bradley University: 1966.
Harold K. Ticho, Emeritus Professor of Physics, University of California, San Diego: 1966, 1973.
Peter H. Tsao, Emeritus Professor of Plant Pathology, University of California, Riverside: 1966.
Sho-Chieh Tsiang, deceased. Economics: 1966.
George L. Turin, Emeritus Professor of Electrical Engineering and Computer Sciences and Dean, School of Engineering and Applied Science, University of California, Berkeley: 1966.
Frank Johannes Tysen, writer: 1966.
Lloyd Ulman, Professor of Economics, University of California, Berkeley: 1966.
Ernest van den Haag, Distinguished Scholar, The Heritage Foundation: 1966.
Robert Lawson Vaught, Professor of Mathematics, University of California, Berkeley: 1966.
David Vestal, photographer, Bethlehem, Connecticut: 1966, 1973.
Friedrich von Huene, President of von Huene Workshop, Brookline, Massachusetts: 1966.
Peter E. Wagner, deceased. Engineering: 1966
James Jerome Walsh, Emeritus Professor of Philosophy, Columbia University: 1966.
Lewis William Wannamaker, deceased. Medicine: 1966.
Aileen Ward, Albert Schweitzer Emeritus Professor of Humanities, New York University: 1966.
Ahmed R. Frank Wazzan, Professor of Engineering and Applied Science and Dean, School of Engineering, University of California, Los Angeles: 1966.
Richard Allen Webster, Professor of History, University of California, Berkeley: 1966.
Robert Clark Wentworth, geophysicist, Golden Gate University, San Francisco: 1966.
Wolfgang Lothar Wiese, Chief, Atomic and Plasma Radiation Division, National Bureau of Standards: 1966.
Charles Frederick Wilcox, Jr., Professor of Chemistry, Cornell University: 1966.
Donald Roger Willis, deceased. Engineering: 1966.
Frank Roy Willis, Emeritus Professor of History, University of California, Davis: 1966.
Emil Wolf, Wilson Professor of Optical Physics, University of Rochester: 1966.
Aaron D. Wyner, deceased. Applied Mathematics: 1966.
James Harvey Young, Candler Professor Emeritus of American Social History, Emory University: 1966.
La Monte Young, composer, New York City: 1966.
Milton Zaitlin, Emeritus Professor of Plant Pathology, Cornell University: 1966.
George Zames, Professor of Electrical Engineering, McGill University: 1966.
Charles Zemach, physicist, Los Alamos Scientific Laboratory, University of California: 1966.
Alexander Zucker, Professor of Physics, Rome State College, 1966.

1966 Latin American and Caribbean Fellows

Jorge Eduardo Allende, Professor of Biochemistry, University of Chile: 1966, 1971.
Isabel Aretz de Ramón y Rivera, Director, Interamerican Institute of Ethnomusicology and Folklore, Caracas: 1966.
Homero Aridjis, poet, México City; International President, International PEN, London, England: 1966, 1979.
Max Aub, deceased. Fiction, Biography: 1966, 1968, 1971.
José Fernando Bonaparte, research paleontologist, National Research Council of Argentina; Head, Division of Vertebrate Paleontology, Argentine Museum of Natural Sciences, Buenos Aires: 1966, 1972.
Luis Jaime Cisneros, Professor of Literature, Pontifical Catholic University of Peru: 1966.
Alberto W. Collie, sculptor, Dallas, Texas: 1966.
Joao Garcia Leme, retired Professor of Pharmacology, University of São Paulo: 1966.
José A. Gautier, deceased. Iberian & Latin American History: 1966.
José Henrique Guimarães, entomologist, Zoological Museum, University of São Paulo: 1966,
Aylthon Brandao Joly, deceased. Biology-Plant Science: 1966.
Kenneth Stephen Julien, head, Professor of Electrical Engineering, University of the West Indies, Trinidad: 1966.
Miguel A. Klappenbach, National Museum of Natural History, Montevideo: 1966.
Francisco Curt Lange, deceased. Music Research: 1966.
Marta Minujín, artist, Buenos Aires, Argentina: 1966.
Honorio Morales, painter: 1966.
Enrique Carlos Pezzoni, editor and translator, Buenos Aires: 1966.
Luis Felipe Ramón y Rivera, academic advisor, Interamerican Instituto of Ethnomusicology and Folklore, Caracas: 1966.
Gabriela Roepke Bahamonde, Playwright; Faculty, University of the Arts, Philadelphia, Pennsylvania: 1966.
Rafael Ramon Romero Castañeda, deceased. Biology, Plant Science: 1966.
Pablo Rubens San Martín, deceased. Biology: 1966.
Prem Prakash Srivastava, deceased. Professor of Theoretical Physics, Brazilian Center for Research in Physics, Rio de Janeiro: 1966.
José Roberto Teixeira Leite, Professor of Art History, State University of Campinas; Art Critic, São Paulo: 1966.
Ricardo Yrarrázaval, painter, Santiago, Chile: 1966.
Iris Milagros Zavala, chairwoman, Professor of Spanish and Portuguese Literatures, University of Utrecht: 1966.

External links
Guggenheim Fellows for 1966

See also
Guggenheim Fellowship

1966
1966 awards